Allan Baxter may refer to:

Allan George Baxter, see List of British police officers killed in the line of duty
Allan Baxter, character in Mega Shark Versus Giant Octopus, played by Lorenzo Lamas

See also
Alan Baxter (disambiguation)